Jonathan Allen Martin is an American politician serving as a member of the Florida Senate for the 33rd district. He assumed office on November 8, 2022.

Early life and education 
Martin was born in Cherokee, Iowa, and moved to Florida in 1986. He earned Bachelor of Arts and Bachelor of Science degrees from Stetson University and a Juris Doctor from the Liberty University School of Law.

Career 
From 2007 to 2014, Martin served as an assistant state attorney for the 20th Judicial Circuit Florida. From 2015 to 2022, he worked as an attorney at Parvey & Frankel Attorneys, P.A. He was also the chairman of the Lee County Republican Executive Committee. In August 2022, he became a partner at Aloia, Roland, Lubell & Morgan, PLLC. In November 2022, Martin was elected to the Florida Senate.

References 

Living people
People from Cherokee, Iowa
Stetson University alumni
Florida Republicans
Florida state senators
Liberty University School of Law alumni
Florida lawyers
Year of birth missing (living people)